Capitola is a Census Designated Place in eastern Leon County, Florida, United States, located at County Road 1540 (Capitola Road) and County Road 1541 (Baum Road).

History 

Evergreen Hills Plantation, a large cotton plantation, occupied the land that is now or extremely close to Capitola. From 1908 through the 1940s Capitola was served by the Florida Central Railroad. Capitola was originally called the town of Mays. Some of the first families that moved into Capitola were the Duprees, Boyds, and the Upchurches.

On March 7, 2008 a confirmed EF1 tornado struck the community with winds estimated at 105 miles per hour. Six to eight houses were damaged near the intersection of Capitola and Whitehouse roads. One minor injury was reported.

Today 

The small town of Capitola, with just a few dozen residents in eastern Leon County, is often overshadowed by its neighbor, Chaires, to the southwest. Fire and rescue services are provided to the community by the Chaires-Capitola Volunteer Fire Department.

The heart of town is marked by the Capitola Joy Mart, a small grocery / convenience store. The area is also home to the Capitola Baptist Church which was established in 1926 and The Capitola Cemetery, where the towns namesake is buried, Capitola DuPree. The Cemetery is located off of Cap Tram road in a very wooded area. Capitola is known for its beautiful southern landscapes with several farms inside the heart of it.

Capitola is also home to the Chaires-Capitola Volunteer Fire Department.

Political 

Note: DePuy was appointed by Governor Jeb Bush in 2004.

References

External links 
Chaires-Capitola Volunteer Fire Department

Unincorporated communities in Leon County, Florida
History of Leon County, Florida
Unincorporated communities in Florida